Eugenius Marius ('Bob') Uhlenbeck (The Hague (Den Haag), 9 August 1913 – Voorhout, 27 May 2003) was a Dutch linguist and Indologist. He was a professor in Javanese at Leiden University. In 1967 he became member of the Royal Netherlands Academy of Arts and Sciences.

Family
His brother was George Uhlenbeck, the theoretical physicist, and the linguist C.C. Uhlenbeck was a cousin of his father.

Selected publications
Taalwetenschap. Een eerste inleiding. Uitg. H.L. Smits, Den Haag.
Beknopte Javaansche grammatica. Uitg. Balé Poestaka, Batavia, 1941.
De systematiek der Javaanse pronomina. Uitg. M. Nijhoff, Den Haag, 1960.
Aantekeningen bij Tjan Tjoe Siem's vertaling van de lakon Kurupati rabi. Uitg. M. Nijhoff, Den Haag, 1960.
A critical survey of studies on the Languages of Java and Madura. Uitg. M. Nijhoff, Den Haag, 1964.
Enige beschouwingen over Amerikaanse en Nederlandse linguïstiek. In: Forum der Letteren 7, 1966, pp. 1–22.
Critical comments on transformational-generative grammar 1962-1972, 1973.
Structurele taalwetenschap. In: Frieda Balk-Smit Duyzentkunst e.a.: Controversen in de taal- en literatuurwetenschap, 1974, pp. 138–168.
Nederlandse voorlichting over generatieve grammatica. In: Forum der Letteren 18, 1977, pp. 167–210.
Studies in Javanese morphology. Uitg. M. Nijhoff, 1978.
Linguistics in America 1924-1974, a detached view. In: H.M. Hoenigswald (ed.): The European background of American linguistics, 1979.

References 

Linguists from the Netherlands
Writers from The Hague
1913 births
2003 deaths
Academic staff of Leiden University
Members of the Royal Netherlands Academy of Arts and Sciences
Fellows of the British Academy
20th-century linguists